Józef Piłsudski (1867–1935) was a Polish politician, military leader, marshal and Chief of State
 Bronisław Piłsudski  (1866–1918) was a cultural anthropologist 

Pilsudski or Piłsudski may also refer to:
Piłsudski (surname)
Piłsudski family, family of nobility
, Polish passenger ship
, Polish passenger ship
, Polish gunboat
Pilsudski (horse), thoroughbred racehorse
Piłsudski coat of arms
Piłsudski's Mound, mound located in Kraków, Poland
Piłsudski Square, square located in Warsaw, Poland
Piłsudski (film), 2019 polish film

See also 
 Piłsudskiite (Piłsudczyk), supporter of Józef Piłsudski